Ouro Ardo  is a commune of the Cercle of Ténenkou in the Mopti Region of Mali. The local government is based in the village of Kondo. The commune includes 29 small villages and in 2009 had a population of 9,114.

References

External links
.

Communes of Mopti Region